Huỳnh Công Đến (born 19 August 2001) is a Vietnamese professional footballer who plays for V.League 2 side PVF-Công An Nhân Dân.

International goals

Vietnam U19

Honours
Vietnam U23
Southeast Asian Games: 2021

References

External links
 

2001 births
Living people
Vietnamese footballers
Vietnam youth international footballers
Association football forwards
V.League 2 players
SHB Da Nang FC players
People from Bình Định province
Competitors at the 2021 Southeast Asian Games
Southeast Asian Games competitors for Vietnam